Bosnia and Herzegovina competed at the 2018 Winter Olympics in PyeongChang, South Korea, from 9 to 25 February 2018, with four competitors in two sports.

Competitors
The following is the list of number of competitors participating in the delegation per sport.

Alpine skiing 

Bosnia and Herzegovina qualified two athletes, one male and one female.

Cross-country skiing 

Bosnia and Herzegovina qualified two athletes, one male and one female.

Distance

See also
Bosnia and Herzegovina at the 2018 Summer Youth Olympics

References

Nations at the 2018 Winter Olympics
2018
2018 in Bosnia and Herzegovina sport